Matthew C. Keifer (born 1954) is the director of the VA Occupational Health and the Specialty Medicine Service Line at the VA Puget Sound, Seattle, WA. Keifer served as director of the National Farm Medicine Center (NFMC) from 2012-2016, and is currently a co-director of the Upper Midwest Agricultural Safety and Health Center, and a project PI within the National Children's Center for Rural and Agricultural Health and Safety. He is an occupational physician and internist who also practiced occupational medicine at the Marshfield Clinic in Marshfield, Wisconsin during his time as the director of NFMC. He is an affiliate professor at the University of Washington School of Public Health, where he was on the active faculty and served as founding co-director of the Pacific Northwest Agricultural Safety and Health Center until 2010. His research areas include pesticide health effects, injuries and illness in agriculture, and clinical occupational injury management.

Early life and education 
Keifer grew up in the Chicago area, spending summers working on the family-owned farm in Edgewood, Iowa. He majored in anthropology at the University of Notre Dame and completed his medical degree at the University of Illinois at Urbana–Champaign after studying medicine for two years in the Dominican Republic.

Awards and honors
 1980 - Alpha Omega Alpha medical honor society
 1981 - The Otto Saphir Award in Pathology
 1982 - Valedictorian Address, University of Illinois School of Medicine
 1982 - Merck Manual Award
 1982 - The Dr. Charles Spencer Williamson Award in Medicine
 2000-2001 - Department of Environmental Health Faculty Outreach Award
 2004 - University of Washington School of Public Health and Community Medicine Outstanding Mentor Award
 2007 - University of Washington School of Public Health and Community Outreach Award
 2009 - Health Sciences/UW Medical Center Community Service Award
 2013 - Convocation address, University of Washington Department of Environmental and Occupational Health Sciences
 2015 - National Safety Council Stakeholder Collaboration Award

References 

1954 births
Living people
American occupational health practitioners
University of Illinois College of Medicine alumni
University of Notre Dame alumni
University of Washington faculty